Urinary tract obstruction is a urologic disease consisting of a decrease in the free passage of urine through one or both ureters and/or the urethra. It is a cause of urinary retention. Complete obstruction of the urinary tract requires prompt treatment for renal preservation. Any sign of infection, such as fever and chills, in the context of obstruction to urine flow constitutes a urologic emergency.

Causes
Causes of urinary tract obstruction include:
 Bladder stone and renal stone
 Benign prostatic hyperplasia
 Obstruction as a congenital disorder.

Congenital urinary tract obstruction
Urinary tract obstruction as a congenital disorder results in oligohydramnios which in turn can lead to the Potter sequence of atypical physical appearance. Pulmonary hypoplasia is by far the main cause of death in the early neonatal period for children with congenital lower urinary tract obstruction.

Fetal surgery of congenital lower urinary tract obstruction seems to improve survival, according to a randomized yet small study.

Sitting voiding position
A meta-analysis on the influence of voiding position on urodynamics in healthy males and males with LUTS showed that in the sitting position, the residual urine in the bladder was significantly reduced. The other parameters, namely the maximum urinary flow and the voiding time were increased and decreased respectively. For healthy males, no influence was found on these parameters, meaning that they can urinate in either position.

Diagnosis

Treatment
Treatment depends on the underlying cause of the obstruction and the severity of the symptoms.

References

External links 

Urological conditions